Fatih Bridge, a.k.a. Bönce Bridge, is a historic Ottoman bridge in Edirne, Turkey. It crosses the Tunca, connecting Edirne Palace to the city.

Constructed by the Ottoman sultan Mehmed the Conqueror in 1452, the bridge has three arches.

References

 Ottoman Architecture, John Freely, page 87, 2011

External links

Ottoman bridges in Turkey
Arch bridges in Turkey
Bridges completed in 1452
Bridges in Edirne
Bridges over the Tunca
Ottoman architecture in Edirne
Road bridges in Turkey
Tourist attractions in Edirne